Halfway Pond a  warm water pond located in Plymouth, Massachusetts between Myles Standish State Forest and Long Pond, west of Round Pond, southwest of Gallows Pond, and north of Fawn Pond and White Island Pond. The pond is fed by groundwater springs and drains into the Agawam River. Halfway Pond Island lies in the middle of the pond and is managed as a research natural area by The Nature Conservancy in Massachusetts. There are almost three miles (5 km) of shoreline.

Access here is informal and can be located off of Mast Road, a portion of which abuts the western shoreline of the pond. Parking is limited to just two or three cars and boaters will have to stick with canoes and other car top craft. Substantial amounts of shoreline are open to fishing.

Halfway Pond village
Halfway Pond, a small village of Plymouth, is located on the southwestern shore of Halfway Pond .

See also

Neighborhoods in Plymouth, Massachusetts
Plymouth, Massachusetts

References

External links
Mass Division of Fisheries and Wildlife - Pond Maps
Six Ponds Improvement Association

Ponds of Plymouth, Massachusetts
Villages in Plymouth, Massachusetts
Villages in Massachusetts
Ponds of Massachusetts